Liam McGeary (born 4 October 1982) is an English professional mixed martial artist who competed in Bellator's Light Heavyweight division. He is a former Bellator Light Heavyweight World Champion.

Mixed martial arts career

Early career
McGeary began training in mixed martial arts in 2009, and held an amateur record of 1-1 before making his professional debut in 2010. He won the first two fights of his professional career via  submission and picked up a knockout win before signing with Bellator MMA.

McGeary competed in kickboxing  in November 2009 and knocked out Kieron Vance in the first round of the Kickboxing Fight Show heavyweight division at the Wolversdene Club in Andover, Hampshire.

McGeary took part in the 2013 IBJJF World Championships, in the purple belt/super heavyweight division. McGeary won the first three matches, by armbar (round 1), triangle-choke (round 2) and armbar (round 3), before losing in the 4th round by points.
McGeary won the London Seni BJJ 2010 tournament in the super heavyweight/blue belt division.

Bellator MMA
In his Bellator debut, McGeary faced Anton Talamantes at Bellator 95 on 4 April 2013 and won via TKO at 78 seconds of the first round.

In his next appearance for the organization at Bellator 100 on 20 September 2013, McGeary faced off against Beau Tribolet and won via knockout only 27 seconds into the fight.

McGeary faced Najim Wali on 15 November 2013 at Bellator 108. He won via submission due to an armbar early in the first round.

In the summer of 2014, McGeary was announced as a participant in the Bellator Light Heavyweight Tournament.  He faced Mike Mucitelli in the opening quarterfinals at Bellator 118 and won via knockout in the first round.  Later, at Bellator 122, he faced Egidijus Valavicius in the semifinals, he won the fight by TKO in the first round. McGeary faced Kelly Anundson in the finals at Bellator 124 on 12 September 2014. He won the fight via inverted triangle choke in the first round.

McGeary faced Emanuel Newton for his Bellator Light Heavyweight Championship on 27 February 2015 at Bellator 134. He won the fight via unanimous decision to become the new Bellator Light Heavyweight champion.  During the course of the fight, McGeary attempted several submission attempts, including nearly finishing Newton in the first and third rounds with a triangle choke. In all, he set the record (11) for the number of submission attempts in Bellator history.

In March 2015, McGeary signed a multi-fight and multi-year contract extension with the promotion.

McGeary made his first title defense against Tito Ortiz on 19 September 2015 at Bellator 142.  He submitted Ortiz with an inverted triangle choke in the first round to retain his championship.

After over a year away from the sport due to a knee injury, McGeary faced Phil Davis at Bellator 163 on 4 November 2016. He lost the bout and his title via unanimous decision.

After losing his title, McGeary returned to the cage in the main event at Bellator 173. McGeary saw his opponent switch three times as he was originally supposed to face Chris Fields. However, on 20 February, it was announced that Fields had to withdraw from the match due to injury. The initial replacement for Fields was announced as Bellator newcomer Vladimir Filipovic. However, Filipovic also was pulled from the bout due to visa issues. McGeary eventually faced Bellator newcomer Brett McDermott. He won the fight via TKO in the second round.

McGeary faced Linton Vassell at Bellator 179 on 19 May 2017. He lost the fight via arm-triangle choke submission in the third round. This was the first stoppage loss of his professional MMA career.

McGeary was expected to face Muhammed Lawal at Bellator 185 on 20 October 2017. However, Lawal pulled out of the bout on 2 October due to an undisclosed injury. He was then scheduled to face late replacement Bubba McDaniel, however, McGeary pulled out of the fight, also due to injury.

McGeary faced Vadim Nemkov on 16 February 2018 at Bellator 194. He lost the fight via TKO in the third round due to leg kicks.

McGeary faced former Strikeforce light heavyweight champion Muhammed Lawal on 15 December 2018 at Bellator 213. He won the fight via TKO in the third round.

McGeary next faced Phil Davis at Bellator 220 on April 27, 2019. He lost the fight via TKO in the third round.

On July 10, 2021, it was announced that he was no longer under contract with Bellator.

Personal life
McGeary is married and has children.

Championships and accomplishments
Bellator MMA
Bellator Light Heavyweight World Championship (One time)
One successful title defense
Bellator 2014 Summer Series Light Heavyweight Tournament Championship
Most submission attempts in a single fight (11)
Tied (with Phil Davis) for most wins in Bellator Light Heavyweight division (nine)
Tied (with Phil Davis and Emanuel Newton) for most bouts in Bellator Light Heavyweight division (12)
MMAJunkie.com
2015 Breakout Fighter of the Year
September 2014 Submission of the Month vs. Kelly Anundson
September 2015 Submission of the Month vs. Tito Ortiz

Mixed martial arts record

|-
|Loss
|align=center| 13–4
|Phil Davis
|TKO (jaw injury)
|Bellator 220
|
|align=center|3
|align=center|4:11
|San Jose, California, United States
|
|-
|Win
|align=center|13–3
|Muhammed Lawal
|TKO (punches)
|Bellator 213
|
|align=center|3
|align=center|0:53
|Honolulu, Hawaii, United States
|
|-
|Loss
|align=center| 12–3
|Vadim Nemkov
|TKO (leg kicks)
|Bellator 194
|
|align=center|3
|align=center|4:02
|Uncasville, Connecticut, United States
|
|-
|Loss
|align=center| 12–2
|Linton Vassell
|Submission (arm-triangle choke)	
|Bellator 179
|
|align=center|3
|align=center|2:28
|London, England
|
|-
|Win
|align=center|12–1
|Brett McDermott
|TKO (doctor stoppage)
|Bellator 173
|
|align=center|2
|align=center|1:06
|Belfast, Northern Ireland
|
|-
|Loss
|align=center|11–1
|Phil Davis
|Decision (unanimous)
|Bellator 163
|
|align=center|5
|align=center|5:00
|Uncasville, Connecticut, United States
|
|-
|Win
|align=center|11–0
|Tito Ortiz
|Submission (inverted triangle choke)
|Bellator 142: Dynamite 1
|
|align=center|1
|align=center|4:41
|San Jose, California, United States
|
|-
|Win
|align=center|10–0
|Emanuel Newton
|Decision (unanimous)
|Bellator 134
|
|align=center|5
|align=center|5:00
|Uncasville, Connecticut, United States
|
|-
|Win
|align=center|9–0
|Kelly Anundson
|Submission (inverted triangle choke)
|Bellator 124
|
|align=center|1
|align=center|4:47
|Plymouth Township, Michigan, United States
|
|-
|Win
|align=center|8–0
|Egidijus Valavicius
|TKO (knees and punches)
|Bellator 122
|
|align=center|1
|align=center|2:10
|Temecula, California, United States
|
|-
|Win
|align=center| 7–0
|Mike Mucitelli
|KO (punch)
|Bellator 118
|
|align=center|1
|align=center|0:22
|Atlantic City, New Jersey, United States
|
|-
|Win
|align=center| 6–0
|Najim Wali
|Submission (armbar)
|Bellator 108
|
|align=center|1
|align=center|1:31
|Atlantic City, New Jersey, United States
|
|-
|Win 
|align=center| 5–0
|Beau Tribolet
|KO (punch)
|Bellator 100
|
|align=center|1
|align=center|0:27
|Phoenix, Arizona, United States
|
|-
|Win 
|align=center| 4–0
|Anton Talamantes
|TKO (elbows and punches)
|Bellator 95
|
|align=center|1
|align=center|1:18
|Atlantic City, New Jersey, United States
|
|-
|Win 
|align=center| 3–0
|Walter Howard
|KO (punch)
|Ring of Combat 41
|
|align=center|2
|align=center|0:41
|Atlantic City, New Jersey, United States
|
|-
|Win 
|align=center| 2–0
|Shaun Lomas
|Submission (triangle armbar)
|Island Rumble 3: Ballistic
|
|align=center|1
|align=center|1:16
|Fort Regent, Jersey, UK
|
|-
|Win 
|align=center| 1–0
|Grzegorz Janus
|Submission (armbar)
|Battle of Jersey
|
|align=center|3
|align=center|4:45
|Saint Helier, Jersey, UK
|

See also
 List of male mixed martial artists

References

External links 

Liam McGeary coverage SBNation.com

1982 births
Living people
Sportspeople from King's Lynn
English male mixed martial artists
Light heavyweight mixed martial artists
Mixed martial artists utilizing Brazilian jiu-jitsu
Black British sportspeople
Bellator MMA champions
English practitioners of Brazilian jiu-jitsu
People awarded a black belt in Brazilian jiu-jitsu